Henri Gautier (1676–1757) was a French aristocrat, landowner and public official.

Biography

Early life
Henri Gautier was born in 1676 in Aix-en-Provence.

Career
He was a clerk to Jean-Claude Guyon, a notary. Later, he served as Treasurer of the Estates of Provence.

He purchased the lands of Le Poët, Vernègues and Valavoire. On 24 April 1724 King Louis XV of France granted him a hereditary title of nobility. In 1730, he purchased the land at the top of the Cours Mirabeau where there was an old watermill and commissioned architect Georges Vallon to design a hôtel particulier that came to be known the Hôtel du Poët.

Personal life
He was married to Anne le Gros. They had a son and four daughters:
Joseph-Antoine de Gautier. He inherited his father's aristocratic titles and served as an Advisor to the Parliament of Aix-en-Provence. He married Anne de Boisson, daughter of Joseph-Gaspard de Boisson and Anne de Pisany de Saint-Laurent. They had children.
(first daughter). She married into the de Dedons de Lis family.
(second daughter). She married into the de Saporta family.
(third daughter). She married into the de Rians family.
(fourth daughter). She married into the de Regina family.

He died in 1757.

References

1676 births
1757 deaths
People from Aix-en-Provence
Provencal nobility